Anonychia is a genus of moths in the family Geometridae described by William Warren in 1893 with type species Anonychia grisea. The genus was described using Nadagara grisea described by Arthur Gardiner Butler and genus Onychia described by Jacob Hübner and two more species added by Frederic Moore i.e. Anonychia lativitta and Anonychia violacea along with his Anonychia rostrifera. The name Anonychia is slightly altered from original Onychia by Hübner and Moore.

Species
 Anonychia antangulata Wehrli, 1939
 Anonychia apora Wehrli, 1937
 Anonychia diversilinea Warren, 1897
 Anonychia fuliginea Wehrli, 1954
 Anonychia grisea Butler, 1883
 Anonychia latifascia Leech, 1897
 Anonychia latifasciaria Leech, 1897
 Anonychia lativitta Moore, 1888
 Anonychia pallida Warren, 1897
 Anonychia psara Wehrli, 1937
 Anonychia rhabdota Wehrli, 1937
 Anonychia rostrifera Warren, 1888
 Anonychia strebla Prout, 1926
 Anonychia trifasciata Hampson, 1902
 Anonychia trinasuta Wehrli, 1937
 Anonychia violacea Moore, 1888

References

External links

 "Anonychia Warren, 1893". BioNames.

Ennominae
Geometridae genera